Chaise Robinson is a Greece international rugby league footballer who plays as a  for the South Sydney Rabbitohs in the NSW Cup.

Playing career
In 2022, Robinson was named in the Greece squad for the 2021 Rugby League World Cup, the first ever Greek Rugby League squad to compete in a World Cup.

References

External links
Greece profile
Greek profile

Living people
Australian rugby league players
Australian people of Greek descent
Greece national rugby league team players
Rugby league players from Sydney
Year of birth missing (living people)
Sportsmen from New South Wales